Picea spinulosa, the Sikkim spruce, is a spruce native to the eastern Himalaya, in India (Sikkim), Nepal and Bhutan. It grows at altitudes of 2,400-3,700 m in mixed coniferous forests.

It is a large evergreen tree growing to 40–55 m tall (exceptionally to 65 m), and with a trunk diameter of up to 1–2.5 m. It has a conical crown with level branches and usually pendulous branchlets.

The shoots are whitish to pale buff, and glabrous (hairless). The leaves are needle-like, 1.7-3.2 cm long, slender, rhombic to slightly flattened in cross-section, glossy green on the upper side, with two conspicuous blue-white stomatal bands on the lower side. The cones are cylindric-conic, 6–12 cm long and 2 cm broad, green or tinged reddish when young, maturing glossy orange-brown to red-brown and opening to 3 cm broad, 5–7 months after pollination; the scales are moderately stiff, with a bluntly pointed apex.

Sikkim spruce is occasionally grown as an ornamental tree in large gardens in western and central Europe for its attractive pendulous branchlets.

References

External links
Gymnosperm Database

spinulosa
Flora of East Himalaya